James Howard Smith (born January 27, 1938) is an American jazz drummer.

Early life and education 
Smith was born in Newark, New Jersey. He studied at the Al Germansky School for Drummers from 1951 to 1954 and the Juilliard School in 1959 and 1960.

Career 
Smith began his professional career in New York City around 1960.

In the 1960s, he played with Jimmy Forrest (1960), Larry Young (1960–62), Lambert, Hendricks, and Ross (1962–63), Pony Poindexter (1963), Jimmy Witherspoon (1963), Gildo Mahones (1963), Jimmy McGriff (1963–65), and Groove Holmes (1965).

From 1967 to 1974 he played with Erroll Garner before moving to California around 1975. He then played with: Benny Carter (1975, 1978, 1985), Sonny Criss (1975), Bill Henderson (1975, 1979), Hank Jones (1976), Ernestine Anderson (1976, 1986), Plas Johnson (1976), Phineas Newborn, Jr. (1976), Harry Edison (1976–78, with Eddie Lockjaw Davis and Zoot Sims), Lorez Alexandria (1977–78), Tommy Flanagan (1978), Terry Gibbs (1978, 1981), Bob Cooper (1979), Marshal Royal (1980), Great Guitars (1980), Barney Kessel (1981), Herb Ellis (1981), Buddy DeFranco (1981), Al Cohn (1983), Red Holloway (1987), and Dave McKenna (1988). In 1993, he toured Japan with Jimmy Smith and Kenny Burrell.

In 1977, Smith performed at the Montreux International Jazz Festival with Oscar Peterson, Eddie "Lockjaw" Davis, Ray Brown, Benny Carter, Miles Davis, Milt Jackson, Dizzy Gillespie, and Count Basie.

Discography
With Ernestine Anderson
Hello Like Before (Concord, 1977)
Be Mine Tonight (Concord, 1987)
With Kenny Burrell
Ellington Is Forever (Fantasy, 1975)
Ellington Is Forever Volume Two (Fantasy, 1975)
With Benny Carter
Benny Carter 4: Montreux '77 (Pablo Live, 1977)
A Gentleman and His Music (Concord, 1985)
With Sonny Criss
Crisscraft (Muse, 1975)
Out of Nowhere (Muse, 1976)
With Harry Edison
Edison's Lights (Pablo, 1976)
Simply Sweets (Pablo, 1978) with Eddie "Lockjaw" Davis
Just Friends (Pablo, 1978 [1980]) with Zoot Sims
With Tommy Flanagan
Something Borrowed, Something Blue (Galaxy, 1978)
With Jimmy Forrest
Forrest Fire (New Jazz, 1960)
With Dizzy Gillespie
Dizzy Gillespie Jam (Pablo, 1977)
With Richard "Groove" Holmes
Soul Message (Prestige, 1965)
Misty (Prestige, 1965)
With Milt Jackson
Feelings (Pablo, 1976)
With Etta Jones
Love Shout (Prestige, 1963)
With Hank Jones
Jones-Brown-Smith (Concord Jazz, 1976) with Ray Brown
With Barney Kessel
Jelly Beans (Concord, 1981)
With Lambert, Hendricks & Bavan
Havin' a Ball at the Village Gate (RCA, 1963)
At Newport '63 (RCA, 1963)
With Gildo Mahones
I'm Shooting High (Prestige, 1963)
The Great Gildo (Prestige, 1964)
With Jimmy McGriff
Jimmy McGriff at the Organ (Sue, 1964)
Blues for Mister Jimmy (Sue, 1965)
With Phineas Newborn, Jr. 
Look Out - Phineas Is Back! (Pablo, 1976 [1978])
With Pony Poindexter
Pony Poindexter Plays the Big Ones (New Jazz, 1963)
Gumbo! (Prestige, 1963) with Booker Ervin
With Jimmy Witherspoon
Baby, Baby, Baby (Prestige, 1963)
With Larry Young
Testifying (New Jazz, 1960)
Young Blues (New Jazz, 1960)
Groove Street (Prestige, 1962)

References
Chris Sheridan, "Jimmie Smith". Grove Jazz online.

1938 births
Living people
American jazz drummers
Musicians from Newark, New Jersey
20th-century American drummers
American male drummers
20th-century American male musicians
American male jazz musicians